Enoclerus muttkowskii is a species of checkered beetle in the family Cleridae. It is found in North America.

References

Further reading

 
 
 

Clerinae
Articles created by Qbugbot
Beetles described in 1909